Statyba Panevėžys was a Lithuanian football club from Panevėžys.

History 

It was founded as Maisto sporto klubas (MSK) (English: Food Sports Club). In 1962 it was taken over by Panevėžio statybos trestas (English: Panevėžys Construction Trust), and because of that it was renamed "Statyba" (English: Construction). It was dissolved in 1977.

Name history 
1935 – MSK Panevėžys
1946 – Lokomotyvas Panevėžys
1947 – Žalgiris Panevėžys
1954 – MSK (Maistas) Panevėžys
1962 – Statyba Panevėžys

Achievements 
Lithuanian Championship/LSSR Top League
Winners (2): 1962–1963, 1968
Runners-up (3): 1942, 1942–1943, 1964
Third places (3): 1946, 1956, 1965
Lithuanian Cup (Tiesa Cup):
Runners-up (3): 1957, 1967, 1971

External links 
Statistics – futbolinis.lt

Defunct football clubs in Lithuania
Sport in Panevėžys
1935 establishments in Lithuania
1977 disestablishments in Lithuania
Association football clubs established in 1935
Association football clubs disestablished in 1977